The Tanti (also anglicised as Tanty, Tantee, Tantubay, Tantubai, Tati, Tatin) are a Hindu vaishya weaving and cloth merchant community in India. The greatest concentration is believed to be in the states of Gujarat, Maharashtra, 
Jharkhand, Bihar, Uttar Pradesh, West Bengal, Assam and Odisha. The community is not very concentrated because their designation was defined based on their occupation rather than particular beliefs or group identity.

Origin 
 
The word tanti is derived from the Odia word tanta, which means a loom. They were traditionally weavers, and are one of the many communities found in South Asia, traditionally associated with this craft. The community is found in Gujarat, Maharashtra, Jharkhand, Bihar, Uttar Pradesh, West Bengal, Assam as well as Odisha

The Tanti are said to have originated as weavers and providers of cloth since the ancient days. They were known for great skill in weaving and the ability to produce both fine linens as well as more common everyday fabrics. Not too long ago, virtually every Tanti home would have had a handloom. The Tanti people are found across mostly the northeastern portion of India.

Notable people
Kamal Kumar Tanti - writer
Tulsi Tanti - businessman

References 

Indian castes
Social groups of Bihar
Weaving communities of South Asia
Social groups of Madhya Pradesh
Social groups of Odisha